Ward Forrest (born 1954) is a retired American soccer forward who spent two seasons in the North American Soccer League.

Forrest attended the University of Washington where he played on the Huskies soccer team from 1972 to 1975.  He then played for the Seattle Sounders of the North American Soccer League in 1977 and 1978.  His son Kevin Forrest also played for the Washington Huskies and for the Seattle Sounders.

References

External links
 NASL stats

1954 births
Living people
American soccer players
North American Soccer League (1968–1984) players
Seattle Sounders (1974–1983) players
Washington Huskies men's soccer players
Soccer players from Washington (state)
Association football forwards